Doron may refer to:

People

Given name
 Doron Almog (born 1951), Israeli soldier
 Doron Ben-Ami (born 1965), Israeli archaeologist
 Doron Egozi (born 1980), Israeli Olympic sport shooter
 Doron Galezer (born 1952), Israeli journalist
 Doron Gazit (born 1953), Israeli environmental artist, activist and industrial designer 
 Doron Gepner (born 1956), Israeli theoretical physicist
 Doron Jamchi (born 1961), Israeli former basketball player
 Doron Kliger, professor
 Doron Lamb (born 1991), American college basketball player
 Doron Matalon (born 1993), Miss Israel 2014
 Doron Perkins (born 1983), American professional basketball player 
 Doron Shefa (born 1961), Israeli professional basketball player
 Doron Sheffer (born 1972), Israeli professional basketball player
 Doron Zeilberger (born 1950), Israeli mathematician

Surname
 Dina Doron, Israeli actress
 Helen Doron (born 1955), British linguist
 Shay Doron (born 1985), Israeli-American professional basketball player

Other uses
 Doron (Pliny), an ancient city located in Cilicia Trachea which was mentioned only by Pliny the Elder
 Doron Kavillio, a character in the Israeli television series Fauda
 Doron Plate, a type of body armor employed in World War II